Mario Romani (16 December 1907 – 25 May 1977) was an Italian professional footballer, who played as a striker.

External links 
Profile at MagliaRossonera.it 
Profile at RosaneroUniverse.it 

1907 births
1977 deaths
Italian footballers
Association football forwards
Serie A players
Serie B players
S.P.A.L. players
A.C. Milan players
Palermo F.C. players